The 1937 Copa Aldao was the final match to decide the winner of the Copa Aldao, the 10th. edition of the international competition organised by the Argentine and Uruguayan Associations together. The final was contested by the same teams than the previous edition, Uruguayan club Peñarol and Argentine club River Plate.

The match was played at San Lorenzo Stadium in Buenos Aires, where River Plate achieved another conclusive victory of 5–2 over Peñarol, winning its second consecutive Copa Aldao Trophy.

Qualified teams

Match details

References

1938 in Argentine football
1938 in Uruguayan football
Peñarol matches
Club Atlético River Plate matches
Football in Buenos Aires